Iron Will is the fourth full-length album by Swedish heavy metal band Grand Magus. The album was recorded in Stockholm, Sweden. It was released in Europe on 9 June 2008, on the record label Rise Above Records, and in the United States on 24 June 2008, through Candlelight Records.

Track listing 
 "Like the Oar Strikes the Water" – 3:13
 "Fear Is the Key" – 3:31
 "Hövding" – 0:39
 "Iron Will" – 5:01
 "Silver into Steel" – 4:15
 "The Shadow Knows" – 5:35
 "Self Deceiver" – 4:49
 "Beyond Good and Evil" – 5:15
 "I Am the North" – 9:03
The song "I Am the North" ends at 5:15. An untitled hidden track starts at 8:05.

Japanese edition bonus track
 "Mountain of Power" (demo)

Personnel
Janne "JB" Christoffersson – vocals, guitars
Mats "Fox" Skinner – bass
Sebastian "Seb" Sippola – drums

References

External links
BLABBERMOUTH.NET – GRAND MAGUS: 'Iron Will' Artwork Revealed

2008 albums
Grand Magus albums
Candlelight Records albums
Rise Above Records albums